William Brian Binnie (April 26, 1953 – September 15, 2022) was a United States Navy officer and one of the test pilots for SpaceShipOne, the experimental spaceplane developed by Scaled Composites and flown from 2003 to 2004.

Early life

Binnie was born in West Lafayette, Indiana, on April 26, 1953, where his Scottish father William P. Binnie was a professor of physics at Purdue University. The family returned to Scotland when Binnie was five, and lived in Aberdeen (his father taught at Aberdeen University) and later in Stirling. When Binnie was a teenager the family moved to Boston.

Binnie earned a bachelor's degree in aerospace engineering from Brown University. He earned a master's degree from Brown in fluid mechanics and thermodynamics. Binnie was rejected by the United States Air Force, and enrolled at Princeton University, where he earned a master's degree in mechanical and aerospace engineering He served for 21 years in the United States Navy as a naval aviator, reaching the rank of commander. He flew the A-7 Corsair II, A-6 Intruder, F/A-18 Hornet, and AV-8B Harrier II. He graduated from the U.S. Naval Test Pilot School in 1988. Binnie also copiloted the Atmospheric Test Vehicle of the Rotary Rocket. In 2006, he received an honorary degree from the University of Aberdeen.

SpaceShipOne and spaceflight

On October 4, 2004, he piloted SpaceShipOne's second Ansari X Prize flight, flight 17P, winning the X Prize and becoming the 436th person to go into space. It also earned him the second Astronaut Badge to be given by the FAA for a flight aboard a privately operated commercial spacecraft.

Later career
In 2014 Binnie joined XCOR Aerospace as senior engineer and test pilot, after working as a test pilot and program business manager for Scaled Composites for many years.

Personal life
Binnie and his wife, Bub, had three children.

Binnie died on September 15, 2022, at age 69.

References

External links

 Biography at Scaled Composites website
 Biography at SpaceFacts.de

1953 births
2022 deaths
American astronauts
American aviation record holders
American people of Scottish descent
American test pilots
Aviators from Indiana
Brown University School of Engineering alumni
Commercial astronauts
Flight altitude record holders
Military personnel from Indiana
People from West Lafayette, Indiana
People who have flown in suborbital spaceflight
Princeton University alumni
Scaled Composites Tier One program
Scaled Composites
United States Naval Aviators
United States Navy officers